(in English, Natural Magic) is a work of popular science by Giambattista della Porta first published in Naples in 1558.  Its popularity  ensured it was republished in five Latin editions within ten years, with translations into Italian (1560), French, (1565) Dutch (1566) and English (1658) printed.

Natural Magic was revised and considerably expanded throughout the author's lifetime; its twenty books (Naples 1589) include observations upon geology, optics, medicines, poisons, cooking, metallurgy, magnetism, cosmetics, perfumes, gunpowder, and invisible writing.

Natural Magic is an example of pre-Baconian science. Its sources include the ancient learning of Pliny the Elder and Theophrastus as well as numerous scientific observations made by Della Porta.

Author 
Giambattista della Porta (also known as John Baptist Porta) was born in Vico Equense, Italy, between October 3rd and November 15th, 1535 and was the second of three sons. The Porta family belonged to the ancient nobility of Solerno, granting them a modest fortune until Giambattista’s father, Nardo Antonio della Porta entered the service of Emperor Charles V in 1541. This allowed the family to alternate residences between Vico Equense and Naples. The nature of Giambattista’s formal education is unknown. Only two of Giambattista’s teachers have been identified: Antonio Pisano, a royal physician in Naples, and Domenico Pizzimenti, a translator of Democritus. It is believed that he was largely self-taught with an informal education that consisted of jovial discussions of scientific and pseudoscientific topics. Giambattista began collecting ‘secrets of nature’ when he was just fifteen. These secrets were eventually compiled and made into the twenty books of Natural Magic.

The Acadéemies of Naples were shut down in 1547 due to ‘political intrigue’ and did not reopen until 1552, just six years before the original publication of Natural Magic. Della Porta had many friends in Naples’ most prestigious academies, and he even opened one himself sometime before 1580: Accademia dei Segreti. Academics gathered in della Porta’s home and discussed the ‘secrets of nature’. Later in life, della Porta became associated with Rome’s Accademia dei Lincei. He had a close relationship with its founder, Frederico Cesi and even wrote a compend of his family history. Porta’s reputation soared in the academy and he was second only to Cesi, until the enrollment of Galileo to the academy in 1611. In the same year, della Porta was entered into Oziosi in Naples, the city’s most renowned literary academy.

Natural Magic was Giambattista’s first book and the one that he is best known for. It was first published as a treatise in 1558. This treatise included four books and presented ‘Magiae Naturalis’ as the “perfection of natural philosophy and the highest science.”¹ This was the basis of the twenty book edition published in 1589. It is a remarkable culmination of the credulity and curiosity of the late Renaissance, and is the basis of Giambattista’s reputation.

Della Porta did attempt to depart from the marvellous curiosities of natural magic for the study of mathematics. He was interested in optics and was a contemporary of Galileo in the development of the principles behind the telescope. In Book XVII of Natural Magic, Giambattista is the first to add a concave lens to the already invented ‘camera obscura’. He experimented with both convex and concave lenses in order to clarify the image of the lens and to provide a mathematical explanation for their refractive properties. Giambattista was actually theorized to have priority in the invention of the telescope, but he reveals his secondary position to Galileo in an unpublished treatise that fails to discuss anything other than his contemporary’s work.

Little is known about the marriage of Giambattista della Porta except that it produced a single daughter. Della Porta was known to have persistent ailments, often caused by anxiety. These included fevers that confined him to bed for months. Giambattista died on February 4, 1615, in Naples.

Contents 
In Giambattista’s preface to Natural Magic he writes, “...if ever any man laboured earnestly to discover the secrets of Nature, it was I; For with all my mind and power, I have turned over the monuments of our ancestors, and if they wrote anything that was secret and concealed, that I enrolled in my catalogue of rarities.” Della Porta intended to compile the secrets of nature. However, Giambattista was skeptical of the discoveries of the past and insisted on making his own through experimentation. Again in his preface he says, “In our method I shall observe what our ancestors have said; then I shall show by my own experience, whether they be true or false…” 

Giambattista describes two different types of magic in Chapter II of Book I. The first is an evil thing having to do with spirits. He calls this sorcery. “The other Magick is natural; which all excellent wise men do admit and embrace, and worship with great applause; neither is there anything more highly esteemed, or better thought of, by men of learning.” This is the magic that della Porta dedicates his studies to.

See also
 Natural magic
 White magic

References

External links
Natural Magic online (archived from the original on 16 April 2018)
Natural Magick From the Collections at the Library of Congress

1558 books
Science books
16th-century Latin books